Sir Edward Stephen Cazalet DL (born 26 April 1936) is a retired judge of the High Court of England and Wales.

Early life
Edward Cazalet was born in 1936, the son of the Queen Mother's racehorse trainer Peter Cazalet and Leonora Wodehouse, the stepdaughter of P. G. Wodehouse. He was educated at Eton and Christ Church, Oxford where he was master of the university drag hounds. His friends included Sir Simon Hornby, who would later marry his sister, Sheran.

Career
Cazalet is a barrister, High Court judge and an authority on P. G. Wodehouse. He was appointed Queen's Counsel in 1985.  Cazalet is the principal trustee of Wodehouse's estate, and in 2016, was "delighted" when the British Library acquired the Wodehouse archive in 2016. He is a member of The Other Club, a London dining club.

Personal life
He is married to the Honourable Camilla Jane Gage, daughter of Henry Gage, 6th Viscount Gage and they have children:
 David Benedict Cazalet (born 24 June 1967)
 Henry Pelham Cazalet (born 16 September 1969), opera singer
 Lara Cazalet (born 1973), actress

References

1936 births
Living people
Deputy Lieutenants of East Sussex
Family Division judges
Knights Bachelor
People educated at Eton College
Alumni of Christ Church, Oxford
Edward